James Stuart Rankin (1880–1960) was an English politician, Conservative MP for Liverpool East Toxteth.

He was returned unopposed at a by-election in 1916, was re-elected at subsequent general elections, but stood down in 1924.

Notes

Politicians from Liverpool
1880 births
1960 deaths
Conservative Party (UK) MPs for English constituencies